Jai Surya High School is a school in Vijay Nagar Urban Estate, Jind, Haryana, India. Established in 1998, Jai Surya High School is a co-educational day school. The foundation stone of the school building was laid in 1997.

See also
Education in India
Literacy in India  
List of institutions of higher education in Haryana

References

External links

High schools and secondary schools in Haryana
Jind district